William Dufour (born January 28, 2002) is a Canadian professional ice hockey player for the Bridgeport Islanders of the American Hockey League (AHL) as a prospect to the New York Islanders of the National Hockey League (NHL). He was selected by the Islanders in the fifth round, 152nd overall, at the 2020 NHL Entry Draft. Dufour played four seasons of junior hockey in the Quebec Major Junior Hockey League (QMJHL) with the Chicoutimi Saguenéens, Drummondville Voltigeurs and Saint John Sea Dogs.

Playing career
Dufour was drafted by the Rouyn-Noranda Huskies of the Quebec Major Junior Hockey League (QMJHL) with the sixth overall pick of the 2018 QMJHL Entry Draft. On January 6, 2019, he was traded to the Chicoutimi Saguenéens. His stint with the Saguenéens lasted until December 15, 2019, when he was traded to the Drummondville Voltigeurs. In June 2021, Dufour was traded to the Saint John Sea Dogs.

Dufour was selected in the fifth round, 152nd overall, of the 2020 NHL Entry Draft by the New York Islanders. The Islanders signed Dufour to a three-year, entry-level contract on April 21, 2022. In his NHL debut on January 18, 2023, Dufour recorded one hit and spent 6:48 minutes on ice as the Islanders lost 4–1 against the Boston Bruins.

Career statistics

Regular season and playoffs

International

Awards and honours

References

External links
 

2002 births
Living people
Bridgeport Islanders players
Canadian ice hockey right wingers
Chicoutimi Saguenéens (QMJHL) players
Drummondville Voltigeurs players
Ice hockey people from Quebec City
New York Islanders draft picks
New York Islanders players
Rouyn-Noranda Huskies players
Saint John Sea Dogs players